Akrillai and Akrilla,  Acrillae (in Latin) was an ancient Greek colony located in the modern province of Ragusa, Sicily, Italy, where the town of Chiaramonte Gulfi stands today. The ruins of the old colony can be found in the contrada (quarter) Piano del Conte-Morana and Piano Grillo. A necropolis dating from the 6th-5th century BC has been identified in the contrada Paraspola-Pirruna.

The name appears in different forms among different authors: Akrilla, Akrille; in ancient sources: Akrillaiu; the name is variously written by Latin writers Acrilla and Acrille.

History

Hellenic era
The city was founded by the Corinthian and Syracusan colonists at the same time of Kamarina (598 BC), overlooking the Valley of the Hipparis to establish their power against the city of Gela, founded by a Cretan-Rhodian effort. Akrillai was also a road-station on the route from Syracuse to Gela and Akragas. By passing via Akrai and Kasmenai, the road avoided the low Hyblaean Mountains and Hybla Heraea.

The city based its economy on trade, thanks to  its strategic position along the Via Selinuntina. Near to Akrillai was the Hellenistic settlement of Scornavacche, where recent excavations have found several clay ovens. Throughout its existence Akrillai remained under the influence of the mother-city Syracuse, with which it was allied. According to the  Roman historian Titus Livius, the city was used as a fortress and military base during the Carthaginians' second Sicilian campaign. In 406 BC, after the fall of Akragas and Gela, the city was destroyed for the first time, as the Carthaginians passed on their way to attack and besiege Syracuse.

Roman Acrillae 
Titus Livius also recounts the battle fought at Akrillai in 213 BC between Syracusan forces guided by the strategos Hippokrates, and the Roman army led by the consul Marcus Claudius Marcellus:

With the defeat of Hippokrates’ Syracusans, the city of Akrillai became part of the Roman province of Sicily, its name Latinized as Acrillae.

Arab Gulfi
In 827 AD the town was destroyed again, this time by the Arabs of Asad ibn al-Furat. The name Acrillae disappeared and the rebuilt centre was known by the Arab name of Gulfi, which means "the rose-garden" and "place rich with vegetation".  The nearby river Dirillo also takes its name from Acrillae: called Achates (agate) during the Greek-Roman era and said to be where agates were first found, in Arab times the river was called Wadi Ikrilu (River of Acrille).

Excavations
Akrillai was discovered by the historian Corrado Melfi and identified by the archaeologist Antonio Di Vita,
an academic of the Lincei, who conducted several campaigns of excavation. The many findings are housed
in the Hyblean Archaeological Museum of Ragusa and in the Regional Archeological Museum of Syracuse.

See also

 List of ancient Greek cities

Notes

Attribution
This article includes material from its counterpart in the Italian-language Wikipedia « :it:Akrillai », specifically from this version.

External links

Archaeological sites in Sicily
Ancient Greek archaeological sites in Italy
Dorian colonies in Magna Graecia
Syracusian colonies
Province of Ragusa
Former populated places in Italy
Ancient cities in Sicily
Greek city-states